The 2000 United States presidential election in Vermont took place on November 7, 2000, and was part of the 2000 United States presidential election. Voters chose three representatives, or electors to the Electoral College, who voted for president and vice president.

Vermont was won by Democratic Vice President Al Gore by 9.93 percentage points over Republican Governor of Texas George W. Bush, while third-party candidate Ralph Nader took nearly 7% of the vote (his second-best showing in the country by percentage). Gore's win in Vermont marked the third consecutive victory for Democrats in the Green Mountain State, cementing the former Republican bastion's powerful shift towards the Democratic Party. This election marked the first time in history that a Republican won the presidency without carrying Vermont, as well as the first time that the Democratic Party carried the state with a majority of the vote for two elections in a row. This also marked the first time that Vermont would vote Democratic in a close presidential election, as well as the only time in history that the state has voted Democratic while neighboring New Hampshire has voted Republican.

As of the 2020 presidential election, this remains the last time that a Republican nominee has received more than 40% of the vote in Vermont, or that the margin of victory was in single digits. It also remains the last presidential election in which a Republican has carried Caledonia, Orange, or Orleans counties, or in fact any county other than bellwether Essex. Bush became the first ever Republican to win the White House without carrying Bennington, Lamoille, Rutland, Washington, or Windsor Counties.

Primaries
 2000 Vermont Democratic presidential primary
 2000 Vermont Republican presidential primary

Results

By county

Counties that flipped from Democratic to Republican
 Caledonia (Largest city: St. Johnsbury)
 Essex (Largest city: Lunenburg)
 Orange (Largest city: Randolph)
 Orleans (Largest city: Derby)

By congressional district
Due to the state's low population, only one congressional district is allocated. This district, called the At-Large district because it covers the entire state, is thus equivalent to the statewide election results.

See also
 United States presidential elections in Vermont

References

2000
2000
Vermont